The lesser Taiwanese shrew (Chodsigoa sodalis) is a rare species of shrew in the Soricomorpha order.

Further reading

Motokawa M., Yu H.-T., Fang Y.-P., Cheng H.-C., Lin L.-K. and Harada M. 1997. Re-evaluation of the status of Chodsigoa sodalis Thomas, 1913 (Mammalia: Insectivora: Soricidae). Zoological Studies 36 (1): 42-47

References

Red-toothed shrews
Mammals described in 1913